Lloyd George Kerns (April 27, 1921 – September 7, 1986) was a member of the Ohio House of Representatives.

References

Republican Party members of the Ohio House of Representatives
1921 births
1986 deaths
20th-century American politicians